Fort Morgan State Armory is a historic 1922 armory building in Fort Morgan, Colorado, Morgan County, Colorado. It was listed on the National Register of Historic Places in 2004. It was designed by John J. Huddart. It is located at 528 State Street and is being used as a recreation center.

References

Armories on the National Register of Historic Places in Colorado
Government buildings completed in 1922
Buildings and structures in Morgan County, Colorado
Fort Morgan, Colorado
National Register of Historic Places in Morgan County, Colorado